The 1983 Town and Country Building Society Women's World Open Squash Championship was the women's edition of the 1983 World Open, which serves as the individual world championship for squash players. The event took place in Perth in Australia during October 1983. Vicki Cardwell won the World Open title, defeating Rhonda Thorne in the final.

Seeds

First round

Second round to final

See also
World Open
1983 Men's World Open Squash Championship

Notes
Vicki Cardwell who had served a two-year team ban in her native Australia duly answered her critics by winning the World Open.
The Australian then duly retired.
Susan Devoy won a third place play off after defeating Carin Clonda 3 games to 1.

References

External links
Womens World Open

World Squash Championships
1983 in squash
1983 in Australian sport
Squash tournaments in Australia
Sport in Perth, Western Australia
1983 in women's squash
International sports competitions hosted by Australia